Alyssum montanum is a species of flowering plant belonging to the family Brassicaceae. It is an evergreen, prostrate perennial with small, hairy, greyish leaves. It typically grows to 10-15 centimeters tall and 30-45 centimeters across. It produces tiny, yellow, fragrant flowers from May to July. These flowers are typically 4-6 centimeters across and borne in dense racemes.

It is native to France, Switzerland, and Germany. It grows best in full sun with good drainage, and is drought tolerant once established. It's suitable for USDA hardiness zones 3–9, but may be susceptible to aphids and root rot.

Subspecies: 
 Alyssum montanum subsp. gmelinii (Jord. & Fourr.) Hegi & E.Schmid (synonym: Alyssum gmelinii Jord.)

References

montanum
Taxa named by Carl Linnaeus
Plants described in 1753